Chloe Ing (Chinese: 伍宣菱, born 12 September 1998) is a Singaporean-Canadian figure skater. She is the 2019 Southeast Asian Games champion, 2017 Southeast Asian Games silver medalist and a four-time senior national champion. She has competed in the final segment at three ISU Championships – the 2017 Four Continents, 2018 Four Continents,  and 2018 Junior Worlds. At the 2017 Merano Cup, she became the first skater representing Singapore to win a senior ladies medal in an ISU-recognized international competition. She won her second international medal at the 2018 Sofia Trophy.

Personal life 
Chloe Ing was born on September 12, 1998, in Singapore, together with her twin sister, Chantelle. She is studying health sciences at the University of Toronto.

Skating career

Early years
Ing began learning to skate in 2006. She made her ISU Junior Grand Prix (JGP) debut in 2013 and would also compete on the JGP series during the following four seasons.

She placed 20th at the 2017 Four Continents Championships in Gangneung, South Korea, and 34th at the 2017 World Junior Championships in Taipei, Taiwan.

2017–2018 season
Ing began her season by winning the silver medal at the 2017 Southeast Asian Games. She obtained the highest free skate score to finish second overall. She then took bronze at the 2017 Merano Cup, making her the first figure skater to win a senior ladies' medal for Singapore at an ISU international competition.

Ing received the gold medal at the 2018 Singapore National Figure Skating Championships. At the 2018 Four Continents Championships, she placed 19th in the short program and 20th in the free skate to finish 19th overall. She then competed at the 2018 World Junior Figure Skating Championships, placing 20th in the short to qualify for the free skate, finishing 23rd overall.

Programs

Results 
CS: Challenger Series; JGP: Junior Grand Prix

References

External links 
 

Living people
1998 births
Singaporean female single skaters
Figure skaters at the 2017 Asian Winter Games
Asian Games competitors for Singapore
Southeast Asian Games silver medalists for Singapore
Southeast Asian Games medalists in figure skating
Competitors at the 2017 Southeast Asian Games
Competitors at the 2019 Southeast Asian Games
Southeast Asian Games gold medalists for Singapore
Singaporean sportspeople of Chinese descent